The 17481 / 17482 Bilaspur–Tirupati Express is an Express train belonging to South Coast Railway zone that runs between  and  in India. It is currently being operated with 17481/17482 train numbers on bi-weekly basis.

Service

The 17481/Bilaspur–Tirupati Express has an average speed of 46 km/hr and covers 1404 km in 30h 30m. The 17482/Tirupati–Bilaspur Express has an average speed of 45 km/hr and covers 1404 km in 31h 10m.

Route & Halts 

The important halts of the train are:

Coach composition

The train has standard ICF rakes with max speed of 110 kmph. The train consists of 16 coaches :

 1 AC II Tier
 2 AC III Tier
 6 Sleeper Coaches
 5 General
 2 Seating cum Luggage Rake

Traction

From Visakhapatnam to Vijayawada it is hauled by WDM-3D / WDM-3A of Guntakal / Visakhapatnam shed and from Vijayawada to  both trains are hauled by a Vijayawada-based WAP-4 / WAG-5P electric locomotive and vice versa.

Direction reversal

The train reverses its direction 2 times:

Rake sharing

The train shares its rake with 17479/17480 Puri–Tirupati Express.

See also 

 Bilaspur Junction railway station
 Tirupati railway station
 Puri–Tirupati Express

Notes

References

External links 

Transport in Tirupati
Transport in Bilaspur, Chhattisgarh
Express trains in India
Rail transport in Chhattisgarh
Rail transport in Odisha
Rail transport in Andhra Pradesh
Railway services introduced in 2005
2005 establishments in India